"G.R.I.N.D (Get Ready It's a New Day)" is a song by American hip hop recording artist Asher Roth. The song was released to radio on July 26, 2010 and as a digital download on July 27, 2010. The song was initially meant to be the lead single for his second studio album, then-titled The Spaghetti Tree.

Music video
The music video was released on September 20, 2010. It was filmed and directed by Marc Klasfeld, a well known music video director. During the video, the setting changes from black and white to full color.

Track listing
 Digital single

Release history

Chart performance

References

2010 singles
Asher Roth songs
Universal Motown Records singles
Songs written by Asher Roth
SRC Records singles
2010 songs
Songs written by Larrance Dopson
Songs written by Lamar Edwards